Branka u Opavy is a municipality and village in Opava District in the Moravian-Silesian Region of the Czech Republic. It has about 1,100 inhabitants.

Geography
The Moravice River flows through the municipality.

History
The first written mention of Branka u Opavy is from 1257.

Twin towns – sister cities

Branka u Opavy is twinned with:
 Kornowac, Poland

References

External links

Villages in Opava District